Ng Wah Catholic Secondary School (also referred to as NWC) is a boys' secondary school in San Po Kong, Wong Tai Sin District, Hong Kong. Founded in 1965 by Catholic Diocese of Hong Kong.

History
Established in 1965 as Sanpokong Catholic College, the school is a government subsidized grammar school for boys, under the sponsorship of the Catholic Diocese of Hong Kong.

Before moving into the new premises, with consent of the school authority of Choi Hung Estate Catholic Secondary School (CHESS), CHECSS was partially used by Ng Wah School in its first year of operation, with a total of 480 junior form students (S1 to S3) in 12 classes.

On 30 March 1966, the present site in San Po Kong were completed and were inaugurated by the then Governor of Hong Kong, Sir David Trench on 14 April 1966.

After a donation by Mr. Ng Ping Kin, an architect and Urban Councillor, the school was renamed Ng Wah College in commemoration of his father, Mr.  (Chinese: 伍華). In the late 1970s, the rooftop of the secondary school building was modified and became the 6th floor to accommodate the then expanding student population.

In 1986, three standard classrooms were also in place in the covered playground. Under the School Improvement Project scheme, a new six-storey annex was built connected the primary school building near Choi Hung Rd. in 2000. In the same year, the three classrooms in the covered playground were converted into a bigger multi-purpose Student Activity Room.

Starting from September 2002, the school was renamed as Ng Wah Catholic Secondary School in accordance with the naming system of schools under the sponsorship of the Hong Kong Catholic Diocese.

Admission
75% of Ng Wah Catholic Secondary School's total Form 1 intake is from its feeder school, Ng Wah Catholic Primary School, with 25% from other primary schools

Motto
The School Motto is Latin phrase "IN CONSILIO SAPIENTIA", which means "To think conscientiously and to discern with intelligence" in English.

Notable alumni
The alumni association is called Ng Wah College - Secondary Old Boys Association, Limited.

Government
 Chan Kin-por, GBS, JP, politician, member of the Legislative Council of Hong Kong (Insurance functional constituency)
 Fred Li Wah-ming, SBS, JP, politician, former member of the Legislative Council of Hong Kong
 Pierre Chan, doctor, politician, member of the Legislative Council of Hong Kong (Medical functional constituency)
 Yu Mun-wa, Retired Chief Superintendent
 Lam Kwok-leung, SBS, CSDSM, retired Commissioner of Hong Kong Correctional Services
 Charlix Wong, JP, retired Director of Accounting Services - The Treasury

Business
 Algernon Yau, former Chief Executive Officer of Cathay Dragon
 Joseph Wong Chong Chun, Chairman and CEO of Stelux Holdings International Limited (寶光實業)
 Edmond Lee, former Director, Société Générale Société Générale
 Ronnie Hui, former CEO of Town Health International Medical Group (康健國際)
 Adrian Tam, General Manager of Sales and Marketing, Octopus Cards Limited
 Kam Ming, American investment banker and political philosopher

Arts and culture
 Comfort Chan Kwong-wing, music composer.
 Ng Chi-Sum (吳志森), presenter.
 William Chak Wai-lim, actor.
 Chris Yeung, Chairperson of Hong Kong Journalists Association
 Mung Wai Leong, Broadcaster of RTHK
 Hinry Lau, Singer-Songwriter and Music Producer
 Johnny Hui, Presenter, Cable News Hong Kong
 Patrick Suen, Hong Kong columnist and film critic
 Jeremy Lau, Hong Kong musician, singer and member of Mirror

Academia
 Daniel Chiu Wah Tsang, Professor, Department of Civil and Environmental Engineering, The Hong Kong Polytechnic University
 Tony Tse, Programme Director of Industry Partnerships, The Hong Kong Polytechnic University
 Ricardo Mak King Sang, Director of Public Examinations, Hong Kong Examinations and Assessment Authority
 Kuo Yong Hong, Assistant Professor, Department of Industrial and Manufacturing Systems Engineering, The University of Hong Kong
 Fung Wai-wah, President of the Hong Kong Professional Teachers' Union
 Yung Yau, Professor of Urban Studies, Department of Sociology and Social Policy, Lingnan University

Sports
 Lai Yiu Cheong, footballer of Metro Gallery FC
 Lam Hin Ting, footballer of Hong Kong Premier League club R&F
 Chan Kwong Ho, footballer of Hong Kong Premier League club Southern
 Cheung Wai Hong, professional basketball player, Hong Kong A1 Division Championship Tycoon Basketball Team

Others
 Ken Leung Kam-wing, businessman, one of the hostages in Manila hostage crisis.

References
 

Educational institutions established in 1965
Catholic secondary schools in Hong Kong
Boys' schools in Hong Kong
San Po Kong
1965 establishments in Hong Kong